The discography of Akon, a Senegalese American singer, songwriter, rapper and music producer, consists of five studio albums, four mixtapes, one extended play, thirty eight singles, eight promotional singles and ninety-two music videos. Born in St. Louis, Missouri, Akon lived in Senegal with his family until the age of seven, when they returned to the United States to live in New Jersey. A three-year prison sentence inspired Akon to begin recording songs in his home studio: Universal Records signed him after becoming aware of his music, and his debut album Trouble was released in June 2004. Two of its singles – "Locked Up" and "Lonely" – reached the top ten of the US Billboard Hot 100, with the latter topping numerous singles charts worldwide and being certified Platinum by the Recording Industry Association of America (RIAA). Trouble also included the singles "Gunshot (Fiesta Riddim)", "Ghetto", "Belly Dancer (Bananza)" and "Pot of Gold", and was eventually certified Platinum by the RIAA and by the British Phonographic Industry in the United Kingdom, where it reached number one on the UK Albums Chart.

Akon's increasing popularity led to him making numerous guest appearances on other artists' songs: in 2005, he appeared on the singles "Baby I'm Back" by Baby Bash and "Soul Survivor" by Young Jeezy, which charted at number 19 and number four on the Billboard Hot 100 respectively. His second studio album, Konvicted, was released the following November to further commercial success, reaching number two on the Billboard 200 and the top twenty of many international albums charts, as well as subsequently being certified triple Platinum by the RIAA. The singles "Smack That", "I Wanna Love You" and "Don't Matter" all achieved commercial success worldwide, with the former reaching number two on the Billboard Hot 100 and topping the New Zealand and UK singles charts, and the latter two becoming his first songs to top the Hot 100. Akon contributed guest vocals to a large number of commercially successful singles throughout 2007 and 2008: "The Sweet Escape" by singer Gwen Stefani, which reached number two on the Australian, New Zealand and UK singles charts as well as in the United States, "I Tried" by Bone Thugs-n-Harmony, "Bartender" by T-Pain, "Sweetest Girl (Dollar Bill)" by Wyclef Jean and "Dangerous" by Kardinal Offishall, among several others.

Akon's third album, Freedom, marked a significant stylistic transition from his first two: it eschewed the hip hop and R&B influences of Trouble and Konvicted for a more dance-pop orientated sound. "Right Now (Na Na Na)", the album's first single, reached number eight on the Hot 100, and the following two singles, "I'm So Paid" and "Beautiful" reached the top forty of the Hot 100, with the latter reaching the top 40 of many singles charts worldwide. Akon continued to frequently appear on singles by other artists following Freedom – in particular the French disc jockey David Guetta single "Sexy Bitch", which topped numerous singles charts worldwide – and his 2010 single, "Angel", reached number 56 on the Hot 100.

Albums

Studio albums

Mixtapes

Singles

As lead artist

As featured artist

Promotional singles

Other charted songs

Guest appearances

Music videos

As lead artist

See also
 Akon production discography

Notes

References

External links
 Official website
 Akon at AllMusic
 
 

Discography
Rhythm and blues discographies
Hip hop discographies
Discographies of American artists